World Report is an Irish radio programme broadcast on RTÉ Radio 1. The programme includes a series of radio-essay reports from journalists and correspondents based around the globe. It often examines some of the less well-covered, but no less critical, developments and conflicts in international news and current affairs. The programme is one of the longest-running weekly broadcasts from RTÉ News. It was launched in 1969 by Sean Duignan and Mike Burns. Presenters over the decades have also included Sean O'Rourke, David McCullagh, Colm Ó Mongáin, John Burke and Diarmaid Fleming.  After the retirement of Ciarán MacMáthuna and the ending of his long-running programme Mo Cheoil Thú in November 2005, World Report moved into the slot vacated in the Sunday morning schedule and now airs at 08:10 for twenty minutes.

The latest episode of the show can be listened to online where there is also a number of previous editions available to download.

References

External links
World Report homepage
RTÉ News - Home
RTÉ News - World
RTÉ News Now Streaming TV News Channel

RTÉ News and Current Affairs
RTÉ Radio 1 programmes